Zanden is a surname. Notable people with the surname include:

Helge Zandén (1886–1972), Swedish painter
Jessica Zandén (born 1957), Swedish actress
Mike van der Zanden (born 1987), Dutch swimmer
Philip Zandén (born 1954), Swedish actor